Spiritualism is a religion postulating the belief that spirits of the dead residing in the spirit world have both the ability and the inclination to communicate with the living.

Spiritualism may also refer to:

Religion
 Spiritism, a similar religious movement, established in France in the mid-nineteenth century, often referred to as "Kardecist spiritism" after its founder Allan Kardec, and quite popular in the Caribbean nations and Brazil
 Spiritualism (beliefs), the belief that spirits of the dead can communicate with the living
 Spiritual church movement, a religious movement with historically African American membership and Christian forms of worship that developed in the United States in the wake of the expulsion of black members from primarily white Spiritualist denominations
 Espiritismo, a cultural variation on Spiritism and Spiritualism, popular in Latin American nations, particularly Mexico

Philosophy
 Spiritualism (philosophy), the idea that there exists an immaterial reality that is beyond the reach of the senses